The 2014–15 DePaul Blue Demons men's basketball team represented DePaul University during the 2014–15 NCAA Division I men's basketball season. The Blue Demons, led by fifth year head coach Oliver Purnell, played their home games at the Allstate Arena, and were members of the Big East Conference. They finished the season 12–20, 6–12 in Big East play to finish in a tie for seventh place. They lost in the first round of the Big East tournament to Creighton.

On March 14, head coach Oliver Purnell resigned. He finished at DuPaul with a five year record of 54–105.

Previous season 
The Blue Demons finished the season 12–21, 3–15 in Big East play to finish in last place. They advanced to the quarterfinals of the Big East tournament where they lost to Creighton.

Departures

Incoming Transfers

Incoming recruits

Roster

Schedule

|-
!colspan=9 style="background:#00438c; color:#F10041;"| Exhibition

|-
!colspan=9 style="background:#00438c; color:#F10041;"| Non-Conference Regular Season

|-
!colspan=9 style="background:#00438c; color:#F10041;"| Big East Conference Play

|-
!colspan=9 style="background:#00438c; color:#F10041;"| Big East tournament

Notes

References

DePaul Blue Demons men's basketball seasons
DePaul